EAV may refer to:

 East Atlanta Village, in Atlanta, Georgia
 Electroacupuncture, an alternative medicine diagnostic device
 Equine arteritis virus, the causal agent of equine viral arteritis
 Entity–attribute–value model, a data model
 Erste Allgemeine Verunsicherung, an Austrian band
 Expired air ventilation
 Exposure action value
 Ente Autonomo Volturno, an Italian public transport company